The Palo Alto Chamber Orchestra or PACO is a youth chamber orchestra based in Palo Alto, California. The emphasis on chamber music sets it apart from other youth orchestras. The orchestra is made up of 5 ensembles (namely SuperStrings, Preparatory, Debut, Sinfonia, and Senior) of about 25 members each who rehearse weekly and perform throughout the year. PACO also conducts international tours with the Senior PACO ensemble occasionally.

History
The Palo Alto Chamber Orchestra was founded in 1966 by William Whitson, who served as the orchestra's music director for 36 years. In 2002, violist Benjamin Simon was appointed the role of music director.

References

External links
Palo Alto Chamber Orchestra

American youth orchestras
Musical groups from the San Francisco Bay Area
Musical groups established in 1966
1966 establishments in California
Youth organizations based in California
Organizations based in Palo Alto, California
Orchestras based in California